College of Community Science (CCSc), formerly College of Home Science (CHSc), is a college in Bikaner, Rajasthan, India affiliated by Swami Keshwanand Rajasthan Agricultural University, Bikaner. It was established in year 1988.

References

External links
Official website

Universities and colleges in Bikaner
Educational institutions established in 1988
1988 establishments in Rajasthan